Maksym Serhiyovych Protsiv (born 7 October 2000) is a Ukrainian professional footballer who plays as a right midfielder for Ukrainian club Nyva Ternopil.

References

External links
 

2000 births
Living people
Sportspeople from Ternopil
Ukrainian footballers
Association football midfielders
FC Ternopil players
FC Nyva Ternopil players
Ukrainian First League players
Ukrainian Second League players